The Space Development and Test Wing (SDTW) was a unit of Air Force Space Command's Space and Missile Systems Center of the United States Air Force. The wing is located at Kirtland Air Force Base in Albuquerque, New Mexico.

The unit was combined with another Space and Missile Systems Center directorate and is now known as the Advanced Systems and Development Directorate.

Mission
The Space Development and Test Directorate develops, tests and evaluates Air Force space systems, executes advanced space development and demonstration projects, and rapidly transitions capabilities to the warfighter.

History
The Space Development and Test Wing was activated 1 August 2006. Prior to that, Detachment 12 of the Space and Missile Systems Center had been activated at Kirtland AFB 29 June 2001, taking responsibility for research, developmental test and evaluation organizations that had been co-located at Kirtland AFB alongside the Air Force Research Laboratory Space Vehicles and Directed Energy Directorates.

 Lineage
 Detachment 2, Space and Missile Systems Center, Onizuka AS, CA
 SMC, Test and Evaluation Directorate, Kirtland AFB, NM
 Detachment 12, Space and Missile Systems Center, Kirtland AFB, NM (activated 29 June 2001)
 Space Development and Test Wing, Kirtland AFB, NM (activated 1 Aug 2006)
 Advanced Systems and Development Directorate, Kirtland AFB, NM
 Past Directors and Commanders
 Craig Martin, Colonel, USAF (retired)
 James Ford, Colonel, USAF (retired)
 Ralph Monfort, Colonel, USAF (retired)

Operations

Units
The Space Development and Test Wing is divided into two Groups, the Space Development Group and the Space Test Group.

 Space Development Group
 Responsive Space Squadron
 Responsive Satellite Command and Control Division
 Human Spaceflight Payloads Division  - Houston, TX
Space Test Group
 Space Test Squadron
 SOC 96 - Schriever AFB
  SOC 97 - Kirtland AFB
 Space Test Operations Squadron
 Launch Test Squadron

References

See also
 Space Test Program
 Space and Missile Systems Center
 C/NOFS
 STP-S26
 Vandenberg AFB Launch Schedule

Military units and formations in New Mexico
Space wings of the United States Air Force
Test wings of the United States Air Force